The 2015–16 Ekstraklasa season was Lechia's 72nd since their creation, and was their 8th continuous season in the top league of Polish football. The season covers the period from 1 July 2015 to 30 June 2016. On 7 August 2015 the club celebrated its 70th anniversary.

Players

First-team squad

Transfers

Players In

Players Out

Friendlies

Summer

Winter

Regular season

Fixtures for the 2015–16 Ekstraklasa season

League table

Championship Group

League table

Polish Cup

Stats

Goalscorers

References

External links

Lechia Gdańsk seasons
Lechia Gdańsk